Wally Dittmar was an Australian rules footballer for the  Football Club.

Coaching
After retiring from playing Wally Dittmar coached at Rosewater and Loxton.

References

1934 births
1982 deaths
Australian rules footballers from South Australia
Port Adelaide Football Club (SANFL) players
Port Adelaide Football Club players (all competitions)